Choctaw County is the name of several counties in the United States:

 Choctaw County, Alabama
 Choctaw County, Mississippi
 Choctaw County, Oklahoma

It is also the name of a Spearhead-class United States Navy ship.